The University of Turku (in , shortened UTU), located in Turku in southwestern Finland, is the third largest university in the country as measured by student enrollment, after the University of Helsinki and Tampere University. It is a multidisciplinary university with eight faculties. It was established in 1920 and also has facilities at Rauma, Pori, Kevo and Seili. The university is a member of the Coimbra Group and the European Campus of City-Universities (EC2U).

History

The Royal Academy of Turku

The first university to be established in Turku was The Royal Academy of Turku, in 1640, which was transferred to the new Capital, Helsinki, after the Great Fire of Turku in 1827.

Three famous Finns began their studies in Turku in 1822. These were Johan Vilhelm Snellman, Elias Lönnrot, and Johan Ludvig Runeberg who have a statue on University Hill. Another reminder of the Royal Academy is the Old Academy Building near the university's campus.

The University of Turku

The modern University of Turku was founded in 1920. The Finnish intelligentsia wanted a purely Finnish university, the first of its kind in Finland. 22,040 people contributed to the fund-raising campaign. Newly gained independence and the campaign are reflected in the motto of the university about a free people's gift to free science. To honour the memory of these donors, the university has named its specially created liqueur "22 040". Developed by the university's own food chemists, the liqueur does homage to some of the distinctive fruits of the Finnish landscape: the cloudberry, the rowan and the sea buckthorn.

The first premises of the University of Turku were in the centre of the city, by the market square. In the 1960s the university started to expand rapidly, a process that still continues.

The university was made a public institution in 1974.

Since 1995 the University of Turku has been a member of the Coimbra Group. In 2017, the university became a member of The European Campus of City-Universities (EC2U).

In January 2010, the Turku School of Economics merged with the University of Turku, forming a seventh faculty of the university. 

In 2021, the Faculty of Technology was established as the eighth faculty of the university.

Enrollment
The university has approximately 22,000 degree students. Bachelor’s, master’s and doctoral degrees are offered both in Finnish and in English. The largest faculties are the Faculty of Humanities and the Faculty of Science and Technology.

The University is a home for The University of Turku Graduate School (UTUGS) which consists of doctoral programmes covering all disciplines. The graduate school has approximately 2,000 doctoral candidates pursuing a PhD.

Faculties 
There are altogether eight faculties in the University of Turku

 Faculty of Humanities
 Faculty of Education
 Faculty of Medicine
 Faculty of Science
 Faculty of Law
 Faculty of Social Sciences
 Turku School of Economics
 Faculty of Technology

In addition to the faculties, the research and learning activities at the university take place in five independent units: Brahea Centre of the University of Turku, Centre for Language and Communication Studies, Turku PET Centre, Finnish Centre for Astronomy with ESO and Turku Bioscience Centre.

Organization

The university management consists of the Board, The Rector and the vice rectors and the University Collegiate Council.

The Board is the highest decision-making organ of the university and is made up of 10 members from academia, society and studentship. It develops the university's operating processes and approves plans concerning its financing and activities; it decide on the guidelines of granting appropriations; it give its opinion in any matters of significance that concern the university in principle and the Board approves the service regulations and other similar rules.

The Rector directs the activities and processes of the university and solves any issues concerning its general management. The Rector represents the university and uses the university's right to speak in courts of law and in dealings with the authorities. Professor Jukka Kola is currently the elected Rector.

The University Collegiate Council consists of 30 members: ten professors, ten other teaching and research personnel and other staff and ten students.

Campus area
The University of Turku shares a campus with Åbo Akademi University and elements of Turku Science Park. The area also encompasses Turku University Hospital (TYKS) and the Student Village. The Main Building and the surrounding complex was built in the fifties on what became known as the University Hill. The campus is constantly expanding, the latest example is the Medisiina D building which houses the facilities of the Faculty of Medicine. The university also owns the Botanic Garden at Ruissalo as well as the research station at the Island of Seili. In addition to the campus area in Turku, the university also has campus areas in the nearby cities of Pori and Rauma.

Research
As defined in its strategy 2030, the university's multidisciplinary research is profiled through six thematic areas which are biodiversity and sustainability; future technologies and digital society; cultural memory and social change; children, young people and learning; health, diagnostics and drug development; and sea and maritime studies.

The University of Turku has been involved in many research projects in the Peruvian Amazon. With the Peruvian Amazon Research Institute (Instituto de Investigaciones de la Amazonía Peruana – IIAP), based in Iquitos, has been studying the Amazon in the BIODAMAZ Project.

Famous alumni
 Sauli Niinistö – 12th and incumbent President of Finland
 Mauno Koivisto – 9th President of Finland
 Liisa Hyssälä – Member of Parliament, Minister of Health and Social Services
 Paula Lehtomäki – Member of Parliament, Minister for Foreign Trade and Development
 Pekka Puska – Member of Parliament, physician
 Ville Niinistö – Member of the European Parliament
 Timo Airaksinen – Professor of Moral Philosophy
 Jarmo Viinanen – diplomat, Secretary General of the Presidential Office
 Heli Laaksonen – poet
 Kaisa Sofia Matomäki – mathematician and SASTRA Ramanujan Prize winner

Rectors

Chancellors

The Chancellor, appointed by the President of Finland upon proposal of the Finnish Government, was to promote science and scholarship, look after the general interests of the university and supervise its activities. The Chancellor confirmed the standing orders and other corresponding general regulations of the university. The most visible task of the Chancellor was the appointment of the Professors and the Docents of the university. Professor Pekka Puska was the last person to hold this position until it was abolished based on the decision of the University Board. The duties were reassigned to the Rector.

See also
 List of modern universities in Europe (1801–1945)

References

External links

 The University of Turku
 Turku Centre for Computer Science (TUCS)

 
Educational institutions established in 1920
University of Turku
Universities and colleges in Finland
1920 establishments in Finland